NCG may refer to:

 National Centre for Geocomputation at Maynooth University, Ireland
 National Co+op Grocers, an American business services cooperative 
 Network of Cancer Genes, a web resource 
 Nicolaus-Cusanus-Gymnasium Bergisch Gladbach, a school in Bergisch Gladbach, Germany
 Nicolaus-Cusanus-Gymnasium Bonn, a school in Bonn, Germany
 Non-circular gear, a gear design
 Noncommutative geometry, a branch of mathematics
 NCG, formerly Newcastle College Group, in England
 NCG Banco, S.A., Spain
 Neighborhood Cinema Group, a movie theater franchise in Michigan, U.S.
 Nisga'a language, ISO 639-3 language code ncg